WPPN is an FM radio station licensed to Des Plaines, Illinois that targets the Chicago metropolitan area. WPPN broadcasts on 106.7 MHz with a Spanish AC format. The station's studios are located at 625 North Michigan Avenue in downtown Chicago, and its transmitter is located in Arlington Heights.

Due to WPPN's 50,000-watt signal and north suburban location, it can be heard through much of the Rockford area and southeastern Wisconsin.

History

Request Radio
The station began broadcasting December 3, 1971, holding the call sign WYEN. The station was owned by Walt-West Enterprises. WYEN aired an all-request format branded "Request Radio", playing music requested by listeners. Contemporary and middle of the road music was played on the station.

"Request Radio" continued airing on the station through the mid–1980s. In 1986, the station was sold to Flint Metro Mass Media for $8 million.

Z Rock
On September 1, 1986 the station's call sign was changed to WZRC, and the station adopted a hard rock/heavy metal format, becoming the first affiliate of the syndicated Z Rock network.

The Wave
In October 1987, the station's call sign was changed to WTWV, and the station adopted a new-age/smooth jazz/soft rock format as "The Wave". The station was an affiliate of the Satellite Music Network, with programming originating on KTWV in Los Angeles.

WYLL
In 1989, the station was sold to Salem Communications for $9,250,000, and the station adopted a Christian contemporary music format, with its call sign being changed to WYLL. However, the format was short-lived, as Salem gradually replaced the Christian contemporary music with Christian talk programming.

By 1991, Christian contemporary music was mostly relegated to weekends. Christian talk and teaching programs heard on WYLL included shows hosted by Alistair Begg, Chuck Swindoll, Adrian Rogers, Chuck Smith, Beverly LaHaye, Jay Sekulow, James Dobson, Hank Hanegraaff, Janet Parshall, and Sandy Rios. As a Christian talk and teaching station, WYLL was branded "Your Station For Life" and later "Chicago's Word".

In 2000, Salem acquired WXRT 1160 (formerly known as WJJD) for $29 million. In February 2001, Salem moved the Christian talk programming of WYLL to 1160, along with the WYLL call letters.

The Fish

With the move of WYLL to 1160, 106.7's call sign was temporarily changed to WYLL-FM. In early March 2001, the station adopted Christian contemporary format branded "106.7 The Fish", with the slogan "Safe for the Whole Family". The station was launched with "40 days and 40 nights" of commercial free music. Shortly thereafter, the station's call sign was changed to WZFS. "The Fish" branding, a reference to the ichthys used in the station's logo, was also used by Salem for Christian contemporary stations in other markets, such as Atlanta, on WFSH-FM 104.7, and Los Angeles, on 95.9 KFSH-FM.

In 2004, Salem agreed to trade WZFS and KSFB 100.7 (now KVVZ) in the San Francisco area to Univision in exchange for KOBT 100.7 in the Houston area (now KKHT-FM), KHCK 1480 in Dallas (now KNGO), KOSL-FM 94.3 in Sacramento (now KGRB), and 560 WIND in Chicago.

Spanish language formats
On November 1, 2004, Univision launched a Spanish-language adult contemporary format on the station, branded "Pasion 106.7". The station's call sign was changed to WPPN shortly thereafter.

In October 2005, Univision tweaked the music blend of WPPN, but left the name and the personalities of "Pasion" in place, with the station shifting to a Spanish oldies/adult hits format.

On January 28, 2009, sister station WVIV-FM changed its format to Spanish oldies and WPPN adopted a Spanish CHR/Hurban format as "La Kalle."

On July 1, 2011, WPPN changed their format back to Spanish adult contemporary, and re-branded as "Pasion 106.7", while the previous "La Kalle" format moved to WVIV-FM 103.1 FM/WVIX 93.5 FM.

In March 2014, WPPN rebranded as "Amor 106.7".

References

External links
WPPN Website

PPN
Univision Radio Network stations
Radio stations established in 1971
1971 establishments in Illinois